The Men's 94 kg weightlifting event was an event at the weightlifting competition, limiting competitors to a maximum of 94 kilograms of body mass. The whole competition took place on 9 October at 14:00. The event took  place at the Jawaharlal Nehru Stadium, Delhi.

Results

References

See also 
2010 Commonwealth Games
Weightlifting at the 2010 Commonwealth Games

Weightlifting at the 2010 Commonwealth Games